Glen MacPherson, CSC/ASC (born October 27, 1957) is a Canadian cinematographer based in Los Angeles.  MacPherson's cinematography career dates to the mid-1980s.  MacPherson is fluent in English and French.

MacPherson started work as a focus puller for the 1981 movie Gas.  In 1983 MacPherson made his debut as a cinematographer with the movie 20th Century Chocolate Cake, directed by Lois Siegel.  For the remainder of the 1980s, MacPherson held down a variety of jobs, including camera assistant, camera operator and a director of photography.  In 1989, he worked on several episodes of The Hitchhiker  which opened the door for work in the United States and beyond.

Filmography

Films

Television

TV series

Keep Your Head Up, Kid: The Don Cherry Story (2010)
Sliders (1995)
Conspiracy of Silence (1991)
C.B.C.'s Magic Hour (1989)
The Hitchhiker (1989)
Thai Cave Rescue (2022)

TV movies

Silver Lake (2004)
Alaska (2004)
Max Q (1998)
Toe Tags (1996)
Calm at Sunset (1996)
Doctor Who (1996)
Captains Courageous (1996)
Shock Treatment (1995)
Bye Bye Birdie (1995)
Johnny's Girl (1995)
Serving in Silence: The Margarethe Cammermeyer Story (1995)
Flinch (1994)
Voices from Within (1994)
For the Love of Aaron (1994)
Lip Gloss (1993)
Dying to Remember (1993)
The Substitute (1993)
The Sea Wolf (1993)
Miracle on Interstate 880 (1993)
The Amy Fisher Story (1993)
Miles from Nowhere (1992)
Deadly Betrayal: The Bruce Curtis Story (1991)
Deadly Surveillance (1991)
Clarence (1990)
Betrayal of Silence (1989)

External links
Official website

Canadian cinematographers
1957 births
Living people
People from Montreal